The 1931 Carnegie Tech Tartans football team represented the Carnegie Institute of Technology—now known as Carnegie Mellon University—as an independent during the 1931 college football season. Led by 17th-year head coach Walter Steffen, the Tartans compiled a record of 3–5–1.

Schedule

References

Carnegie Tech
Carnegie Mellon Tartans football seasons
Carnegie Tech Tartans football